Wierzbinek  is a village in Konin County, Greater Poland Voivodeship, in west-central Poland. It is the seat of the gmina (administrative district) called Gmina Wierzbinek.

The village has a population of 380.

References

Wierzbinek
Pomeranian Voivodeship (1919–1939)